Several different religions are practised in Indonesia.
Indonesia is officially a presidential republic and a unitary state. Indonesia has the world's largest Muslim population and the first principle of Indonesia's philosophical foundation, Pancasila, requires its citizens to state "the One and almighty God". Consequently, atheists in Indonesia experience official discrimination in the context of registration of births and marriages and the issuance of identity cards. In addition, the Aceh province officially enforces Sharia law and is notorious for its discriminatory practices towards religious and sexual minorities. There are also pro-Sharia and fundamentalist movements in several parts of the country with overwhelming Muslim majorities.

Several different religions are practised in the country, and their collective influence on the country's political, economic and cultural life is significant. Despite constitutionally guaranteeing freedom of religion, the government recognises only six religions since 1965: Islam, Christianity (Catholicism, under the label of "Katholik", and Protestantism, under the label of "Kristen" are recognised separately), Hinduism, Buddhism and Confucianism. In that same year, the government specify that it will not ban other religions, specifically mentioning Judaism, Zoroastrianism, Shinto, and Taoism.  According to a 2017 decision of the Constitutional Court of Indonesia, "the branches/flows of beliefs"—ethnic religions with new religious movements—must be recognised and included in an Indonesian identity card (KTP). Based on data collected by the Indonesian Conference on Religion and Peace (ICRP), there are about 245 unofficial religions in Indonesia.

Indonesian law between 1975 and the 2017 Constitutional Court decision required its citizens to have a KTP that identifies them with one of the six religions. (since 2017 citizens that don't identify with those religions may identify themselves to profess "believe in Divine Omnipotence" or leave that section blank). Indonesia does not recognise agnosticism or atheism, and blasphemy is illegal. In 2018 Indonesian governmental statistics, 86.7% of Indonesians identified themselves as Muslim (with Sunnis about 99%, Shias about 1% and Ahmadis 0.2%), Christianity (7.6% Protestantism, 3.12% Catholicism), 1.74% Hindu, 0.77% Buddhist, 0.03% Confucian and 0.05% others.

History 

Until the beginning of CE, the peoples of Indonesia followed the local tribal Austronesian and Papuan ethnic religions and traditions.

Historically, immigration from the Indian subcontinent, mainland China, Portugal, the Arab world, and the Netherlands has been a significant contributor to the diversity of religion and culture within the archipelago. However, these aspects have changed due to some modifications made to suit the Indonesian culture.

Before the arrival of the Abrahamic religions of Islam, Christianity and Judaism, the prevalent religions in the region were the Indian religions of Hinduism and Buddhism. They were brought to the archipelago around the second and fourth centuries, respectively, when Indian traders arrived on the islands of Sumatra, Java and Sulawesi, and brought their religion. The Shaivite sect of Hinduism started to develop in Java in the fifth century CE. Hinduism had a decisive influence on the ideology of the one-man rule of the Raja, and was the dominant religion in Indonesia before the arrival of Islam. The traders also established Buddhism which developed further in the following century and several Hindu and Buddhist-influenced kingdoms were established, such as Kutai, Srivijaya, Majapahit, and Shailendra. The world's largest Buddhist monument, Borobudur, was built by Shailendra and around the same time, the Hindu monument Prambanan was also built. The peak of Hindu-Javanese civilisation was the Majapahit empire in the fourteenth century, and is described as a 'Golden Age' in Indonesian history.

Islam was introduced to the archipelago in the thirteenth century. Coming from Gujarat, India (some scholars also propose the Arabian and Persian theories), Islam spread through the west coast of Sumatra and then developed to the east in Java. This period also saw Islam-influenced kingdoms established, namely Demak, Pajang, Mataram and Banten. By the end of the fifteenth century, 20 Islam-based kingdoms had been established, reflecting the domination of Islam in Indonesia.

The Portuguese introduced Christianity in the 16th century, notably to the island of Flores and to what was to become East Timor. Protestantism was first introduced by the Dutch in the 16th century with Calvinist and Lutheran influences. For the Dutch, economic benefit rather than religious conversion were paramount, and missionary efforts avoided predominantly Muslim areas such as Java. The Dutch East India Company (VOC) regulated the missionary work so it could serve its own interests and focused it to the eastern, Animist part of the archipelago, including Maluku, North Sulawesi, Nusa Tenggara, Papua and Kalimantan. Christianity later spread from the coastal ports of Kalimantan, and missionaries arrived among the Torajans on Sulawesi. Parts of Sumatra were also targeted, most notably the Batak people who are predominantly Protestant today.

The Sukarno era was characterised by a "distrust" between religion and the state. There were also significant changes to the relationship during the New Order. Following an attempted coup in 1965 that officially blamed the Communist Party of Indonesia (PKI) and an anti-communist purge, the New Order government attempted to suppress PKI supporters by making it mandatory to have a religion since PKI supporters were mostly atheists. As a result, citizens were required to carry personal identification cards indicating their religion. The policy resulted in a mass conversion, with most to Catholicism and Protestantism. Chinese Indonesians, who were mostly Confucianists, also faced similar circumstances. Because Confucianism was not one of the state-recognised religions, many converted to Christianity.

Islam

Sunni Islam 
The history of Islam in Indonesia is complex and reflects the diversity of Indonesian cultures. There is evidence of Arab Muslim traders entering the Indonesian archipelago as early as the 8th century. Venetian explorer, Marco Polo is credited with the earliest known record of a Muslim community around 1297 AD, whom he referred to as a new community of Moorish traders in Perlak, Aceh. Over the 15th and 16th century, the spread of Islam accelerated via the missionary work of Maulana Malik Ibrahim (also known as Sunan Gresik, originally from Samarkand) in Sumatra and Java and Admiral Zheng He (also known as Cheng Ho, from China) in north Java, as well as campaigns led by sultans that targeted Hindu-Buddhist kingdoms and various communities, with each trying to carve out a region or island for control. Four diverse and contentious sultanates emerged in northern and southern Sumatra, west and central Java, and southern Kalimantan. The sultans declared Islam as a state religion and pursued war against each other as well as the Hindus and other non-Muslim infidels.

Subsequently, Hindu, Buddhist, Confucian, animist communities and unbelievers bought peace by agreeing to pay jizya tax to a Muslim ruler, while others began adopting Islam to escape the tax. Islam in Indonesia is in many cases less meticulously practised in comparison to Islam in the Middle East. In some regions, people retained and continued their old beliefs. They adopted a syncretic version of Islam,  while others left and concentrated as communities in islands that they could defend, for example, Hindus of western Java moved to Bali and neighbouring small islands. While this period of religious conflict and inter-Sultanate warfare was unfolding, and new power centres were attempting to consolidate regions under their control, European powers arrived. The archipelago was soon dominated by the Dutch empire, which helped prevent inter-religious conflict, and slowly began the process of excavating, preserving and understanding the archipelago's ancient Hindu and Buddhist period, particularly in Java and the western islands.

The vast majority of Indonesian Muslims (about 99%) practice Sunni Islam of the Shafi‘i school. Smaller numbers follow other schools (madhhabs), and the Salafi movement. The main divisions of Islam in Indonesia are traditionalism and modernism. Both are supported by Indonesia's two largest Islamic civil society groups Nahdlatul Ulama and Muhammadiyah, respectively. the orders of Sufism are considered essential.

Concerning the political expansion of Islam after the resignation of Suharto, political parties were again permitted to declare an ideology other than Pancasila. Several Islamist parties formed with Sharia as their ideology and the Crescent Star Party (PBB) came in sixth place in the 1999 elections. However, in 2009 elections, the PBB ranked only 10th, while parties characterised by moderate and tolerant Islamic interpretations had more significant success, such as the Prosperous Justice Party (PKS) coming in 4th with nearly 8% of total votes.

Shia Islam 

Shia Islam played an important role in the early period of the spread of Islam in North Sumatra and Java. Currently, there are approximately 1-3 million Twelvers in Sumatra, Java, Madura and Sulawesi islands, and also Ismailis in Bali, which approximates more than 1% of the total Muslim population. Shias form a segment of Arab Indonesians and the Hadhrami people. The main organisation is "Ikatan Jamaah Ahlulbait Indonesia" (IJABI).

Ahmadiyya 

The earliest history of Ahmadi Muslims in the archipelago dates back to the summer of 1925, when roughly two decades before the Indonesian revolution, a missionary of the Community, Rahmat Ali, stepped in Sumatra and established the movement with 13 devotees in Tapaktuan, Aceh. The community has had an influential history in Indonesia's religious development, yet in modern times it has faced increasing intolerance from religious establishments and physical hostilities from radical Muslim groups. In Ahmadiyya organisation Jamaah Muslim Ahmadiyah Indonesia (JMAI), there are an estimated 400.000 followers, which equates to 0.2% of the total Muslim population, spread over 542 branches across the country; in contrast to independent estimates, the Ministry of Religious Affairs (Indonesia) estimates around 80.000 members. A separatist group, Lahore Ahmadiyya Movement for the Propagation of Islam, known as Gerakan Ahmadiyah-Lahore Indonesia (GAI) in Indonesia, has existed in Java since 1924 and had only 708 members in the 1980s.

Minor religions

Christianity 

The government officially recognises the two main Christian divisions in Indonesia, Catholicism and Protestantism, as two separate religions.

Catholicism 

Catholicism arrived in the archipelago during the Portuguese arrival with spice-trading over the 14th and 15th century. Many Portuguese had the goal of spreading Catholicism, starting with the Maluku Islands in 1534. Between 1546 and 1547, the pioneer Christian missionary, Saint Francis Xavier, visited the islands and baptised several thousand locals. During the VOC era, the number of Roman Catholicism practitioners fell significantly, due to the VOC's policy of banning the religion. The hostility of the Dutch toward Catholicism is due to its history where the Protestant Dutch gained their independence after the Eighty Years War against Catholic Spain's rule. The most significant result was on the island of Flores and East Timor where the VOC concentrated. Moreover, Roman Catholic priests were sent to prisons or punished and replaced by Protestant clergy from the Netherlands. One Roman Catholic priest was executed for celebrating Mass in prison during Jan Pieterszoon Coen's tenure as Governors of the Dutch East Indies. After the VOC collapsed and with the legalisation of Catholicism in the Netherlands starting around 1800, Dutch Catholic clergy predominated until after Indonesia's independence. In present-day Flores, the royal house of Larantuka formed the only native Catholic kingdom in Southeast Asia around the 16th century, with the first king named Lorenzo.

Other than Flores, Central Java also have significant numbers of Catholics. Catholicism started to spread in Central Java when Frans van Lith, a priest from the Netherlands came to Muntilan in 1896. Initially, his effort did not produce a satisfying result until 1904 when four Javanese chiefs from Kalibawang region asked him to give them education in the religion. On 15 December 1904, a group of 178 Javanese were baptised at Semagung, Muntilan, district Magelang, Central Java, near the border of Yogyakarta.

As of 2018, 3.12% of Indonesians are Catholics, nearly half the number of Protestants at 7.6%. The practitioners mostly live in West Kalimantan, Papua and East Nusa Tenggara. The province of East Nusa Tenggara, where the island of Flores and West Timor are located, is the only province in Indonesia where Catholics are the majority (about 54.14% of the total population). In Java, next to Javanese, Catholicism also spread to Chinese Indonesians. In the present day, Catholic traditions close to Easter days remain, locally known as Semana Santa. It involves a procession carrying statues of Jesus and the Virgin Mary (locally referred to as Tuan Ana and Tuan Ma respectively) to a local beach, then to Cathedral of the Queen of the Rosary, the Roman Catholic Diocese of Larantuka, Flores.

Orthodoxy 
Eastern Christianity operates in Indonesia under the label "Kristen" together with Protestants.
 
Eastern Orthodoxy is represented by the Indonesian Orthodox Church (Moscow Patriarchate), which until 2019 was part of the Russian Orthodox Diocese of Sydney, Australia and New Zealand (Russian Orthodox Church Outside Russia), and then comes under the unified spiritual leadership of the Diocese of Singapore (Russian Orthodox Church).
 
In addition, there are communities of Oriental Orthodoxy, namely the Syriac Orthodox Church (Indonesian: Kanisah Ortodoks Suriah) and Coptic Orthodox Church (Indonesian: Gereja Kristen Ortodoks Koptik di Indonesia).

Protestantism 

Protestantism is mostly a result of Calvinist and Lutheran missionary efforts during the country's colonial period. The Dutch Reformed Church was long at the forefront in introducing Christianity to native peoples and was later joined by other Reformed churches that separated from it during the 19th century. The VOC regulated the missionary work so it could serve its own interests and restricted it to the eastern part of the Indonesian archipelago. Although these two branches are the most common, a multitude of other denominations can be found elsewhere in Indonesia.

Protestants form a significant minority in some parts of the country. Statistically, 7.6% of the total population declared themselves Protestant in a 2018 census. Seventeen per cent of the population in Sulawesi are Protestants, particularly in Tana Toraja regency in South Sulawesi province and Central Sulawesi. Furthermore, up to 65% of the ethnic Torajans are Protestants. The Batak people from North Sumatra is also one of the major Protestant groups in Indonesia, comprising around 50% out of all ethnic population. Christianity was brought by German Lutheran missionary Ludwig Ingwer Nommensen who is known as the apostle to the Batak people and started the Batak Christian Protestant Church also called HKBP,  which is the largest Lutheran church in Asia.

Anglicanism is present in Indonesia since 1819, during the British Invasion of Java, when church services were provided towards interdenominational English speaking communities in Java. In 1822, Singaporean-based London Missionary Society purchased a land in Batavia (now Jakarta) and in 1829 constructed of what is now known as All Saints Church. The organization become affiliated with Church of England and is an autonomous part of Anglican Communion since 1857  and is oldest English-speaking institutions in Indonesia. In 1993, Anglican Diocese of Singapore established "Deanery of Indonesia". In 1998, Gereja Anglikan Indonesia (lit. Anglican Church of Indonesia) was founded to provide better services to native Indonesians. As of 2022, the congregation is present in Jakarta, Bandung, Surabaya, Batam, Medan, Nunukan, Pontianak, Ambon, and Tarakan.

Other branches of Christianity also exists in Indonesia, such as; Mormonism (since 1969)  and Jehovah's Witnesses (since 1930).  Previously banned due to the refusal to salute Indonesian flags and refusal to participate in politics,  Jehovah's Witness was officially registered to the Ministry of Religious Affairs in March 2002. Meanwhile for Mormonism, Russell M. Nelson, the president of the Church of Jesus Christ of Latter-day Saints (LDS Church) visited Vice Presidential Palace of Indonesia in November 2019, where he officially met Ma'ruf Amin, the Vice President of Indonesia. 

Chinese Indonesians are also a significant part of the Protestant population, scattered throughout Indonesia with the majority concentrated in major urban areas. In 2000, approximately 35% of ethnic Chinese were Christian, and there is a continuous increase among the younger generation. In some parts of the country, entire villages belong to a distinct denomination, such as Adventism, the International Church of the Foursquare Gospel, Lutheran, Presbyterian or the Salvation Army (Bala Keselamatan) depending on the success of missionary activity.

Indonesia has three Protestant-majority provinces, West Papua, Papua, and North Sulawesi, with 60%, 68% and 64% of the total population respectively. In Papua, it is most widely practised among the native Papuan population. In North Sulawesi, the Minahasan population centred around Manado converted to Christianity in the 19th century. Today, most of the population native to North Sulawesi practice some form of Protestantism, while transmigrants from Java and Madura practice Islam. Adherents of Protestantism mostly live in North Sumatra, West Kalimantan, Central Kalimantan, South Sulawesi, West Sulawesi, Central Sulawesi, North Sulawesi, East Nusa Tenggara, North Maluku, Maluku (province), West Papua (province), Papua (province).

The Communion of Churches in Indonesia is the sole umbrella for most Protestant churches.

Hinduism 

Hindu culture and religion arrived in the archipelago around the 2nd century CE, which later formed the basis of several Hindu-Buddhist kingdoms such as Kutai, Mataram, and Majapahit. Around 130, a Sundanese kingdom named Salakanagara emerged in western Java. It was the first historically recorded Indianised kingdom in the archipelago, created by an Indian trader following marriage to a local Sundanese princess. The largest Hindu temple in Indonesia, Prambanan, was built during the Majapahit kingdom by the Sanjaya dynasty. The kingdom existed until the 16th century when Islamic empires began to develop, this period known as the Hindu-Indonesian period.

Hinduism in Indonesia takes on a distinct tone from other parts of the world. Hinduism, referred to as Agama Hindu Dharma in Indonesia, formally applied the caste system. It also incorporated native Austronesian elements that revered hyangs, deities and spirits of nature and deceased ancestors. The Hindu religious epics, the Mahabharata and the Ramayana, are expressed in Indonesian wayang puppetry and dance. All practitioners of Agama Hindu Dharma share many common beliefs, mostly the Five Points of Philosophy, the Panca Srada. These include the belief in one Almighty God (Brahman), belief in the souls and myriad of local and ancestral spirits and karma or the belief in the law of reciprocal actions, rather than belief in cycles of rebirth and reincarnation. In addition, the religion focuses more on art and ritual rather than scriptures, laws and beliefs. In many areas on Java, Hinduism and Islam have heavily influenced each other, in part resulting in Abangan and Kejawèn (Kebatinan) traditions.

According to the 2010 census, Hindus numbered 4 million (1.7% of Indonesians). The Parisada Hindu Dharma Indonesia has disputed this figure, who estimated as many as 18 million Hindus in the country. The majority of Hindus live in Bali. Sumatra, Java, Lombok, Kalimantan and Sulawesi also have significant Hindu populations; most are Balinese who migrated to these areas through government-sponsored transmigration program or urbanised Balinese attracted to cities in Java, especially the Greater Jakarta area. The Tamil Indonesians in Medan represents another important concentration of Hindus.

There are indigenous religions that are incorporated into the Hinduism (not all followers agree): Hindu Kaharingan of Dayak people; Javanese Hinduism of Tenggerese tribe; Hindu Tolotang of Bugis; and Aluk Todolo of Toraja.

There are also some international Hindu reform movements, including the International Society for Krishna Consciousness, Sathya Sai Organization, Chinmaya Mission, Brahma Kumaris, Ananda Marga, Sahaja Yoga, and Haidakhandi Samaj.

Buddhism 

Buddhism is the second oldest religion in Indonesia, arriving around the sixth century. The history of Buddhism in Indonesia is closely related to that of Hinduism, as some empires based on Buddhist culture were established around the same period. The Indonesian archipelago has witnessed the rise and fall of powerful Buddhist empires such as Shailendra dynasty, Srivijaya and Mataram Empires. The arrival of Buddhism was started with trading activities that began in the early first century on the Silk Road between Indonesia and India. According to some Chinese sources, a Chinese monk on his journey to India, witnessed the powerful maritime empire of Srivijaya based in Sumatra. The empire also served as a Buddhist learning centre in the region. Some historical heritage monuments can be found in Indonesia, including the Borobudur Temple in Yogyakarta and statues or prasasti (inscriptions) from the earlier history of Buddhist empires.

Following the downfall of President Sukarno in the mid-1960s and the mandatory policy of having a religion, founder of Perbuddhi (Indonesian Buddhists Organisation), Bhikku Ashin Jinarakkhita, proposed that there was a single supreme deity, Sanghyang Adi Buddha. He was also backed up with the history behind the Indonesian version of Buddhism in ancient Javanese texts, and the shape of the Borobudur Temple.

According to the 2018 census, roughly 0.8% of Indonesians are Buddhists, which takes up about 2 million people. Most Buddhists are concentrated in Jakarta, although other provinces such as Riau, North Sumatra and West Kalimantan also have a significant number of practitioners. However, the figures are likely higher, since practitioners of Confucianism and Taoism, the latter of which is not considered an official religion, referred to themselves as Buddhists on the census. Today, most Buddhists are Chinese Indonesians and, to a lesser extent, among the Javanese and Balinese. Among the Indonesian Buddhists, the major Buddhist schools are Mahayana, Vajrayana, and Theravada. Most Chinese Indonesians follow a syncretic flows with Chinese beliefs, such as the three teachings (Tridharma) and Yiguandao (Maytreya).

Confucianism 

Confucianism originated in China and was brought to Indonesia by Chinese merchants as early as the 3rd century AD. Unlike other religions, Confucianism evolved more into loose individual practices and belief in the code of conduct, rather than a well-organised community with a sound theology—akin to a way of life or social movement than a religion. It was not until the early 1900s that Confucianists formed an organisation, called Khong Kauw Hwe (THHK) in Batavia.

After the Indonesian independence in 1945, Confucianism was affected by several political conflicts. In 1965, Sukarno issued Presidential Decree No. 1/Pn.Ps/1965, recognising that six religions are embraced by the Indonesian people, including Confucianism. In 1961, the Association of Khung Chiao Hui Indonesia (PKCHI) (now the Supreme Council for the Confucian Religion in Indonesia) had declared that Confucianism is a religion and Confucius is their prophet.

During the New Order, the anti-China policy became a scapegoat-like method to gain political support from the masses, especially after the fall of PKI, which had allegedly been backed by China. In 1967, Suharto issued controversial Presidential Instruction No. 14/1967, which effectively banned Chinese culture, including documents printed in Chinese, expressions of Chinese belief, Chinese celebrations and festivities, and even Chinese names. However, Suharto acknowledged that the Chinese Indonesians had a large amount of wealth and power, despite consisting only 3% of the population.

In 1969, Statute No. 5/1969 was passed, restoring the official total of six religions. However, it was not always put into practice. In 1978, the Minister of Home Affairs issued a directive asserting there are only five religions, excluding Confucianism. On 27 January 1979, a presidential cabinet meeting decided that Confucianism is not a religion. Another Minister of Home Affairs directive in 1990 re-iterated the total of five official religions in Indonesia. Therefore, the status of Confucianism during the New Order regime was never clear. De jure, there were conflicting laws, because higher laws permitted Confucianism, but lower ones did not recognise it. De facto, Confucianists were not recognised by the government, and they were forced to register with one of the original five official religions to maintain their citizenship. This practice was applied in many places, including the national registration card, marriage registration, and family registration card. Civics education in Indonesia taught school children that there are only five official religions.

Following the fall of Suharto in 1998, Abdurrahman Wahid was elected as the country's fourth president. He rescinded the 1967 Presidential Instruction and the 1978 Home Affairs Ministry directive, and Confucianism once again became officially recognised as a religion in Indonesia. Chinese culture and activities were again permitted.

Indigenous religions 

A number of ancestral animistic/polytheistic indigenous religions (Austronesian and Papuan ethnic beliefs) are present, which were dominant throughout the archipelago before the arrival of Dharmic and Abrahamic religions. Some still exist in some parts of Indonesia as either pure or syncretic. They include:
 Batak Parmalim
 Buginese Tolotang
 Dayak Kaharingan
 Javanese Kejawèn
 Karo Pemena
 Manusela Naurus
 Mentawai/Sakuddei Arat Sabulungan
 Minahasan Tonaas Walian
 Nias Fanömba adu (Pelebegu)
 Papuan (Asmat, etc.) Adat
 Sangirese Masade
 Sasak Wetu Telu
 Savu Jingi Tiu
 Sumbese Marapu
 Sundanese/Baduy Sunda Wiwitan
 Talaud Adat Musi
 Toraja Aluk Todolo, and others.

The non-official number of ethnic believers is up to 20 million. The government often views indigenous beliefs as kepercayaan adat (custom) rather than agama (religion) or as a variant of a recognised religion. Because of this, followers of these beliefs such as Dayak Kaharingan have identified themselves as Hindu as a result to avoid pressure to convert to Islam or Christianity. Several native tribal beliefs such as Sunda Wiwitan, Toraja Aluk Todolo, and Batak Parmalim — although different from Indian-influenced Balinese Hinduism — might seek affiliation with Hinduism to survive, while at the same time also preserving their distinction from mainstream Indonesian Hinduism dominated by the Balinese. In many cases, some of the followers of these native beliefs might convert to Christianity or Islam, at least registered as such on their KTP while still upholding and performing their native beliefs.

However, "the branches/flows of beliefs", including local new religious movements, are partly recognised according to a 2017 decision of the Constitutional Court. It rules that the law requiring people whose 'religion is not recognised', or followers of indigenous religions to leave the religion column on identity documents blank is contrary to the constitution.

Kejawèn (Javanese beliefs) 

Kejawèn (Javanese beliefs) or Kebatinan is an amalgam of animism, Hindu-Buddhist, and Islamic — especially Sufi — beliefs. The beliefs are rooted in Javanese history and spiritualism with the tendency to syncretise aspects of different religions in search for a common ground. Kejawèn is generally characterised as mystical, and some varieties were concerned with spiritual self-control. Although there were many varieties circulating in 1992, Kejawèn often implies pantheistic worship because it encourages sacrifices and devotions to local and ancestral spirits. These spirits are believed to inhabit natural objects, human beings, artefacts, and grave sites of the important wali (Muslim saints). Illness and other misfortunes are traced to such spirits, and if sacrifices or pilgrimages fail to placate angry deities, the advice of a dukun or healer is sought. Kejawèn, while it connotes a turning away from the aggressive universalism of orthodox Islam, moves toward a more internalised universalism. In this way, Kebatinan moves toward eliminating the distinction between the universal and the local, the communal and the individual.

The Kejawèn have no certain prophet, a sacred book, nor distinct religious festivals and rituals; it has more to do with each adherent's internalised transcendental vision and beliefs in their relations with others and with the supreme being. As a result, there is an inclusiveness that the kebatinan believer could identify themselves with one of six officially recognised religions, at least in KTP, while still subscribe to their kebatinan belief and way of life. This loosely organised current of thought and practice was legitimised in the 1945 constitution and, in 1973, when it was recognised as Kepercayaan kepada Tuhan Yang Maha Esa (Believer of One Supreme God) that somewhat gain the status as one of the agama. President Suharto regarded himself as one of its adherents.

The formal Kejawen/Kebatinan movements are Subud, Sumarah, Pangestu, Perjalanan, Amerta, and others.

Subud 

Subud is an international spiritual movement that began in Indonesia in the 1920s as a movement related to Sufism and Javanese beliefs founded by Muhammad Subuh Sumohadiwidjojo. (The name Subud was first used in the late 1940s when Subud was legally registered in Indonesia.) The basis of Subud is a spiritual exercise commonly referred to as the latihan kejiwaan, which was said by Muhammad Subuh to be guidance from "the Power of God" or "the Great Life Force".

Muhammad Subuh saw the present age as one that demands personal evidence and proof of religious or spiritual realities, as people no longer just believe in words. He claimed that Subud is not a new teaching or religion, but only that the latihan kejiwaan itself is the kind of proof that humanity is looking for. There are now Subud groups in about 83 countries, with a worldwide membership of about 10,000.

Saminism 

Indonesian social-religious Saminism Movement (also Sedulur Sikep) rejected the capitalist views of the colonial Dutch, was founded by Surosentiko Samin in north-central Java (Blora) in the late 19th and early 20th centuries.

Other 

Dukun and pawang are Indonesians' terms for a shaman (the Malays in Indonesia use word bomoh). Their societal role is that of a traditional healer, spirit medium, custom and tradition experts and on occasion sorcerers and masters of black magic. In common usage, the dukun is often confused with another type of shaman, the pawang. It is often mistranslated into English as "witch-doctor" or "medicine man". Many self-styled shamans in Indonesia are scammers and criminals, preying on gullible and superstitious people who were raised to believe in the supernatural.

Other religions and belief systems

Judaism 
The early Sephardi Jews establishment in the archipelago came from Portugal and Spain in the 17th century. In the 1850s, about 20 Jewish families of Dutch and German origins lived in Batavia. Some lived in Semarang and Surabaya. Several Baghdadi Jews also settled. Before 1945, there were about 2.000 Dutch Jews in Indonesia. Some Jews even converted to Christianity or Islam during the Japanese occupation when Jews were sent to internment camps, and the Indonesian National Revolution when Eurasians were targeted. In 1957, it was reported that around 450 Jews remained, mainly Ashkenazim in Jakarta and Sephardim in Surabaya. The community decreased to 50 in 1963 and to 20 in 1997.

Jews in Surabaya maintained a synagogue for many years, with sporadic support from relatives and co-religionists residing in Singapore. Beth Shalom closed in 2009 after radical groups protested against Israel's assault on Gaza that year. It was later designated a heritage site by the Surabaya government, but was demolished in May 2013 without warning as part of a mysterious real estate deal.

Since 2003, "Shaar Hashamayim" synagogue has been serving the local Jewish community of some 20 people in Tondano city, North Sulawesi, which is attended by around 10 Orthodox Jews (Hasidic Chabad group). Currently, it is the only synagogue in Indonesia that provides services.

The organisation "The United Indonesian Jewish Community" (UIJC) has been formed since 2009 and inaugurated in October 2010. In 2015, the first official Jewish centre, "Beit Torat Chaim", was inaugurated by the Religious Affairs Ministry. It is located in Jakarta and will be led by Rabbi Tovia Singer.

Bahá'í Faith 

According to the Association of Religion Data Archives in the Bahá'í Faith in Indonesia had 22,115 adherents in 2005.

The community is subject to a measure of government discrimination. Since 2014, the situation has improved in the form of government plans for possible recognition (there was an erroneous opinion on already held the official recognition of the Bahai in 2014).

Sikhism 

Sikhs migration to Indonesia began in the 1870s (guardians and traders). There are several gurdwaras and schools in Sumatra and Java, for example, in Medan was built in 1911. In 2015, the Supreme Council for the Sikh Religion in Indonesia was founded. Numbering about 7.000 (or between 10.000 and 15.000), Sikhs are not officially recognised by the government, resulting in adherents referring to themselves as Hindus on the KTP.

Apart from the orthodox, Sikhism in Indonesia represented the Sikh reformist movement Radha Soami Satsang Beas (RSSB).

Jainism 
A small Jain community, Jain Social Group Indonesia (JSG Indonesia), exists in Jakarta among Indian Indonesians.

Chinese folk religion

New religious movements 
The most famous of the new religious movements in Indonesia are Theosophical Society, Transcendental Meditation movement, Falun Gong, and originated in Indonesia Subud and Eden community (Jamaah Alamulla).

Atheism 

Although there is no specific law that bans atheism, legal cases in which atheists have been charged with blasphemy for publicly expressing atheist points of view have raised the issue of whether it is de facto illegal to do so according to Pancasila. Some clerics invoke the first Pancasila principle to argue that it is illegal, while legal scholars say that the principle was adopted as a compromise between secular nationalist, Muslim and non-Muslim founders, and not intended to ban atheism. Nonetheless, atheists as a group tend not to express their atheism publicly for fear of prosecution.

In 2012, civil servant Alexander Aan was sentenced to 30 months in prison for writing "God doesn't exist" on his Facebook page and sharing explicit material about the prophet Muhammad online, sparking nationwide debate. Alexander's lawyers speculated that there were only around 2,000 atheists in Indonesia, but stated that it was difficult to estimate due to the threat of imprisonment for open atheism.

Interfaith relations 
Although the government recognises several different religions, inter-religious conflicts have occurred. During the New Order, President Suharto proposed the Anti-Chinese law which prohibits anything related to Chinese culture, including names and religions. Suharto also made an effort to "de-Islamicise" the government, by maintaining a large proportion of Christians in his cabinet. However, in the early 1990s, the issue of Islamisation appeared, and the military split into two groups, the Nationalist and Islamic camps. The latter, led by General Prabowo Subianto, was in favour of Islamisation, while General Wiranto was in the former in favour of a secular state.

During the New Order, the transmigration program continued after it was initiated by the Dutch East Indies government in the early nineteenth century. The intention was to move millions of people from overcrowded and populated Java, Bali and Madura to less populated regions, such as Ambon, Lesser Sunda Islands and Papua. It has received much criticism, being described as a type of colonisation by the Javanese and Madurese who also brought Islam to non-Muslim areas. Citizens in western Indonesia are mostly Muslims with Christians a small minority, while in eastern regions, the Christian populations are similar in size or larger than the Muslim population. This more even population distribution has led to more religious conflicts in the eastern regions, including Poso riots and the Maluku sectarian conflict communal violence since the resignation of President Suharto.

The government has made an effort to reduce the tension by proposing the inter-religion cooperation plan. The Foreign Ministry, along with the most prominent Islamic organisation in Indonesia, Nahdatul Ulama, held the International Conference of Islamic Scholars, to promote Islamic moderation, which is believed to reduce the tension in the country. On 6 December 2004, the "Dialogue On Interfaith Cooperation: Community Building and Harmony" conference was opened. The meeting, attended by ASEAN countries, Australia, East Timor, New Zealand and Papua New Guinea was intended to discuss possible cooperation between different religious groups to minimise inter-religious conflict in Indonesia.

Nevertheless, the 2010 report to the United States Congress by the United States Commission on International Religious Freedom noted attacks against the Shia communities in Indonesia, particularly in East Java and Madura. In one incident in Madura, local villagers surrounded Shia houses and demanded they desist religious activities, but the crowd was dispersed by local leaders and clergy. On the issue of the Ahmadiyya , Indonesia has failed to act and uphold their human rights. Several Ahmadi mosques were burnt in 2008. 126 Ahmadis have become refugees within their own country in the four years before 2012.

There is, however, indications that religious conflicts regarding the building of places of worships have more to do with business interest than in religious issues. For example, the dispute over a Bethel Injil Sepenuh Church (GBIS) in Jakarta was due to land dispute dating back to 1957, while the Indonesia Christian Church (GKI) Taman Yasmin dispute in Bogor was due to the municipal government plan to turn the church's area into a business district. The Taman Yasmin Church in Bogor has been upheld and protected by Supreme Court of Indonesia, but the mayor of Bogor refused to comply with the court ruling. A positive form of relations has also appeared in society, such as the effort from six different religious organisations to help the 2004 tsunami victims. In 2011, the interfaith 'Indonesia Sunni and Shia Council' (MUHSIN) was established.

In 2017, the blasphemy trial of Basuki Tjahaja Purnama (Ahok) received international attention. In 2016, at a campaign stop during the capital city's gubernatorial election, Ahok stated some citizens would not vote for him because they were being "threatened and deceived" by those using the verse Al-Ma'ida 51 of the Qur'an and variations of it. After a university lecturer, Buni Yani edited the video containing his speech, widespread protests against him ensued, culminating in his controversial imprisonment in May 2017. The Joko Widodo administration responded by banning the Indonesian chapter of Hizb ut-Tahrir. Subsequent government attempts, particularly by the country's intelligence agency (BIN), in curbing radicalism has been called an attack on Islam by some sectarian figures.

Census data regarding religion 
Religion was a census variable in the 1961, 1971, 1980, 1990, 2000, 2010 and 2018 and in various intercensal surveys. Being deemed divisive, the 1961 census data regarding religion was not published. In 1971, three groups of Christians were recorded: Catholic, Protestant and other. The U.N. Demographic Yearbook 1979 only lists data collectively for all Christians. In the 2000 census, only Catholics and Protestants were available as categories.

 
The drop in the Catholic population between 1990 and 2000 was due to the secession of East Timor.

Religious composition by ethnic group (2010 Census) 

In 2018, based on data from the BPS stated that 86.7% of Indonesians are Muslims, 10.72% Christians (7.6% Protestants, 3.12% Roman Catholic), 1.74% Hindu, 0.77% Buddhists, 0.03% Confucians and 0.05% Others.

See also 

 Culture of Indonesia
 Demographics of Indonesia
 Mythology of Indonesia

Footnotes

Bibliography

External links 
 
 
 
 Kemanusiaan di Atas Agama - Humanity Above Religion

 
Religious demographics
Indonesia